Yiğityolu can refer to:

 Yiğityolu, Bağlar
 Yiğityolu, Karayazı